Scott Anthony Padgett (born April 19, 1976) is a retired American professional basketball player and current assistant to the head coach for Mississippi State men's basketball. He was formerly the head coach at Samford University. He played for the National Basketball Association's Utah Jazz, Houston Rockets, New Jersey Nets, and Memphis Grizzlies.

High school
Padgett was born and raised in Louisville, Kentucky. He played basketball at St. Xavier High School in Louisville, was recruited by head coach Rick Pitino and committed to play college basketball for the University of Kentucky.

College
Padgett saw limited playing time during his freshman season (1994–95) on a roster that included future NBA players Wayne Turner, Tony Delk, Rodrick Rhodes, Walter McCarty, Jeff Sheppard, Mark Pope and Antoine Walker. Padgett averaged 2.0 points per game and 1.2 rebounds per game while appearing in 14 games. He also had academic problems and was not eligible to play during the following year.

Padgett returned to Kentucky for the second half of the 1996–97 season. He became an integral part of that team, playing alongside future NBA players Ron Mercer, Derek Anderson, Nazr Mohammed and Jamaal Magloire. Padgett scored 15 points against his hometown University of Louisville, 24 points against the University of Tennessee and 17 points in the NCAA national championship game against the University of Arizona. The 1996–97 Kentucky team finished as the NCAA runner-up. For the season Padgett averaged 9.6 points per game and 5.1 rebounds per game, and was named to the All-NCAA Final Four Team.

Padgett was the starting power forward on the 1997–98 team, and was one of its leading players as it won the 1998 NCAA Tournament. During that season, he distinguished himself nationally with good inside play, strong rebounding, and surprising outside shooting skills for a big inside player. On the season Padgett averaged 11.4 points per game, 6.6 rebounds per game and 2.1 assists per game while shooting 48.0% from the floor, 39.4% from 3 point range and 83.7% from the free throw line. In the NCAA tournament, he scored 19 points in a regional semifinal matchup against UCLA, 12 points - including a go-ahead three pointer to cap a 17-point comeback - in a regional final against Duke University, and 17 points in the NCAA national championship game against the University of Utah. Honors Padgett won that season included being named First Team All-American (Wooden), All-NCAA Final Four Team, All-NCAA Regional Team, Second Team All-SEC (Coaches), Third Team All-SEC (AP), All-SEC Tournament and Academic All-SEC.

During Padgett's senior season he tallied his 1,000th career point at Kentucky. That 1998–99 team lost the NCAA regional final. In his senior season, he averaged 12.6 points per game, 5.9 rebounds per game and 2.6 assists per game. Highlights of the season included scoring 29 points  and grabbing 10 rebounds against the University of Kansas in a second round NCAA tournament game. Padgett was also named to the All-NCAA Regional Team, was First Team All-SEC (Coaches) and Second Team All-SEC (AP) and Academic All-SEC. He was also named the Most Valuable Player of the Southeastern Conference tournament.

NBA
Padgett was selected with the 28th overall pick by the Utah Jazz in the first round of the 1999 NBA Draft. During his rookie season, he started nine games and averaged 2.6 points per game. By his third season Padgett was already established in the team's rotation, averaging 6.7 points and 3.8 rebounds per game, and appeared in every game during his fourth and final season with the team.

In 2003, Padgett joined the Houston Rockets and was mainly utilized as a backup for two seasons which included the highlight of his NBA career where on January 21, 2005, he made a one-handed, off balance last second shot to win against the New York Knicks. After which he signed with the New Jersey Nets.

On June 30, 2006, Padgett was waived by the Nets, and returned to the Rockets on September 30. On February 13, 2007, he was traded to the Memphis Grizzlies for center Jake Tsakalidis. He was waived on April 4. At the end of his seventh NBA season, Padgett scored 1,874 points in 448 games.

On April 7, 2007, Padgett signed for the remaining of the year with CB Granada of the ACB.

Media career
In 2007, Padgett left the NBA and returned to Louisville, co-hosting The Dave and Scott Show with former University of Louisville football player Dave Ragone. This program was a sports talk morning radio show that was syndicated throughout the state of Kentucky from 6 a.m. to 8 a.m. on 93.9 FM The Ticket (ESPN Radio). In late 2008, 93.9 The Ticket was taken off the air and moved to their AM 1600 sister station. The Dave and Scott Show was moved to television on Louisville's CW affiliate in the same time slot.

Coaching career
On April 16, 2009 it was announced that Padgett would be returning to his alma mater along with his former college teammate Tony Delk to serve on coach John Calipari's staff at the University of Kentucky. Padgett left Kentucky to take a job coaching at Manhattan College for the 2010–2011 season where he served as an assistant under former teammate Steve Masiello.

On April 25, 2012, Padgett was hired by new head coach Bennie Seltzer to the coaching staff at Samford in Birmingham, Alabama. When Seltzer was dismissed in June 2014, Padgett was promoted to head coach of the Bulldogs. Padgett was let go on March 16, 2020, after six seasons. On July 31, 2020 Padgett was hired as an assistant coach to  Paul Weir’s staff at  New Mexico

Head coaching record

Personal
Scott was born to Linda and Will Padgett. He is married to Cynthia and has three children: Logan, Lucas, and Layla.

Notes

External links
 Samford profile
 ACB profile
 Kentucky Wildcats bio

1976 births
Living people
American expatriate basketball people in Spain
American men's basketball coaches
American men's basketball players
Basketball coaches from Kentucky
Basketball players from Louisville, Kentucky
CB Granada players
College men's basketball head coaches in the United States
Houston Rockets players
Kentucky Wildcats men's basketball coaches
Kentucky Wildcats men's basketball players
Liga ACB players
Manhattan Jaspers basketball coaches
Medalists at the 1997 Summer Universiade
Memphis Grizzlies players
New Jersey Nets players
New Mexico Lobos men's basketball coaches
Samford Bulldogs men's basketball coaches
Small forwards
Sportspeople from Louisville, Kentucky
St. Xavier High School (Louisville) alumni
Universiade gold medalists for the United States
Universiade medalists in basketball
Utah Jazz draft picks
Utah Jazz players